"Hidden Agenda" is a song by English singer Craig David. It was written by David and producer Mark Hill for his second studio album, Slicker Than Your Average (2002). The song was released on 6 January 2003 as the album's second single and became his eighth top-10 hit in the United Kingdom (including his Artful Dodger collaborations), peaking at number 10 and spending six weeks inside the UK top 75. After the change in sound between his debut album Born to Do It and "What's Your Flava?", the lead single from Slicker Than Your Average, "Hidden Agenda" returned David to the sound for which he was known for in his worldwide hits such as "7 Days" and "Walking Away" and re-united him with Artful Dodger record producer Mark Hill.

Music video
The music video for "Hidden Agenda" features Puerto Rican model Roselyn Sánchez and was directed by directing team Calabazitaz. The video was filmed in Tlacotalpan, Veracruz, México.

Track listings

Notes
  signifies an additional producer

Charts

Weekly charts

Year-end charts

Release history

References

2003 singles
2003 songs
Atlantic Records singles
Craig David songs
Songs written by Craig David
Warner Music Australasia singles